Scheggia e Pascelupo is a comune (municipality) in the Province of Perugia in the Italian region Umbria, located about 40 km northeast of Perugia. The municipal seat is located in the main village of Scheggia, just below Scheggia Pass on Route SS/SR 3 Flaminia, following the ancient Via Flaminia.

History
The site was a Roman Mansio (an official stopping place) named Mutatio ad Hensem on the Via Flaminia, at the crossing with the path Gubbio – Sassoferrato, which here crossed the Appennini. Near the pass, according to the Tabula Peutingeriana, lay the temple of Jupiter Apenninus, one of the largest sanctuaries of the Umbrians, of which no traces have been found so far. 

In the 12th century the village was a possession of the Hermitage of Fonte Avellana, founded by Saint Romuald on the slope of Monte Catria. This retreat later became a large Benedictine monastery, which ruled on the whole territory around Scheggia. Later the village became a possession of Perugia and then of the Montefeltro, until it became part of the Papal States.

In 1444 near the village were possibly found the Iguvine Tablets, the most important document of the Umbrian language. 

Pascelupo, autonomous municipality until 1878, merged with Scheggia forming the current municipality.

Borders
Scheggia e Pascelupo, located close to the borders with the Marche region, borders with the following municipalities: Cantiano, Costacciaro, Frontone, Gubbio, Sassoferrato, and Serra Sant'Abbondio.

Main sights
The abbey of Sant'Emiliano in Congiuntoli is situated close to the municipality.

References

Sources

External links

 Scheggia e Pascelupo official website

Cities and towns in Umbria